Robert Colquhoun (1914–1962) was a Scottish painter, printmaker and theatre set designer.

Robert Colquhoun may also refer to:
 Robert Colquhoun (14th century), of Clan Colquhoun; chief of Colquhoun and Luss
 Robert Colquhoun (East India Company officer) (1786–1838), organizer of the Kemaoon Battalion during the Gurkha War
 Robert Gilmour Colquhoun (1803–1870), British diplomat
 Robert Colquhoun (bowls) (1882–?), English bowls player